This is a list of captains of various ice hockey teams which have represented Canada in international play.

Summit Series team captains
1972 None
1974 Pat Stapleton

Canada Cup team captains
1976 Bobby Clarke
1981 Denis Potvin
1984 Wayne Gretzky and Larry Robinson (co-captains)
1987 Wayne Gretzky
1991 Wayne Gretzky

World Cup of Hockey team captains
1996 Wayne Gretzky
2004 Mario Lemieux
2016 Sidney Crosby

Winter Olympics men's & women's team captains
Men's
1920 Frank Fredrickson
1924 Dunc Munro
1928 John Porter
1932 William Cockburn
1936 Herman Murray
1948 George Mara
1952 Billy Dawe
1956 Jack McKenzie
1960 Harry Sinden
1964 Hank Akervall
1968 Marshall Johnston
1980 Randy Gregg
1984 Dave Tippett
1988 Trent Yawney
1992 Brad Schlegel
1994 Fabian Joseph
1998 Eric Lindros
2002 Mario Lemieux
2006 Joe Sakic
2010 Scott Niedermayer
2014 Sidney Crosby
2018 Chris Kelly
2022 Eric StaalWomen's
1998 Stacy Wilson
2002, 2006 Cassie Campbell
2010 Hayley Wickenheiser
2014 Caroline Ouellette
2018, 2022 Marie-Philip Poulin

IIHF Canada men's national ice hockey team captains
Note: The Ice Hockey World Championships were not held in Winter Olympic years prior to 1972 (no tournaments in 1980, 1984, and 1988). Until 1968, the Olympic Ice Hockey champions were considered the Ice Hockey World champions for that year.

1930 Howard Armstrong
1931 Gord MacKenzie
1933–1939 No captain
1949–1950 No captain
1951 Hector Negrello
1954 Tom Campbell
1955 George McAvoy
1958 Harry Sinden
1959–1965 No captain
1966 Terry O'Malley
1967 Roger Bourbonnais
1969 No captain
1977 Phil Esposito
1978 Marcel Dionne
1979 Guy Charron
1981 Lanny McDonald
1982 Bobby Clarke
1983 Darryl Sittler
1985 Dave Taylor
1986 Marcel Dionne
1987 Mike Foligno
1989 Steve Yzerman
1990 Paul Coffey
1991 Doug Lidster
1992 Glenn Anderson
1993 Adam Graves
1994 Luc Robitaille
1995 Brian Tutt
1996 Steve Thomas
1997 Dean Evason
1998 Keith Primeau
1999 Rob Blake
2000 Mike Sillinger
2001 Michael Peca* and Ryan Smyth
2002–2005 Ryan Smyth
2006 Brendan Shanahan
2007–2009 Shane Doan
2010 Ryan Smyth* and Ray Whitney
2011 Rick Nash
2012 Ryan Getzlaf
2013 Eric Staal
2014 Kevin Bieksa
2015 Sidney Crosby
2016 Corey Perry
2017 Claude Giroux
2018 Connor McDavid
2019 Kyle Turris
2021 Adam Henrique
2022 Thomas Chabot
2023 TBD

Note: Michael Peca was injured (missed the rest of the tournament); Ryan Smyth replaced him as captain.

Note: Ryan Smyth was injured (missed the rest of the tournament); Ray Whitney replaced him as captain.

IIHF Canada women's national ice hockey team captains
Note: The IIHF World Women's Championships tournament was not held in Winter Olympic years until 2022. Regional championships were held in 1995 and 1996, and the 3/4 Nations Cup has been held yearly since 1996.

1990 Sue Scherer
1992, 1994 France St. Louis
1995–1998 Stacy Wilson
1999–2001 Thérèse Brisson
2002–2006 Cassie Campbell
2007–2013 Hayley Wickenheiser
2014 Caroline Ouellette
2015–present Marie-Philip Poulin

World Junior (U-20) championships
Note: The first three tournaments (1974–76) are unofficial. The first official tournament was held in 1977.

 1974 Doug Jarvis
 1976 Fern LeBlanc
 1977 Dale McCourt
 1978 Ryan Walter
 1979 John-Paul Kelly
 1980 Rick Lanz, Dave Fenyves
 1981 Marc Crawford
 1982 Troy Murray
 1983 James Patrick
 1984 Russ Courtnall
 1985 Dan Hodgson
 1986 Jim Sandlak
 1987 Steve Chiasson
 1988 Theoren Fleury
 1989 Éric Desjardins
 1990 Dave Chyzowski
 1991 Steven Rice
 1992 Eric Lindros
 1993 Martin Lapointe
 1994 Brent Tully 
 1995 Todd Harvey
 1996 Nolan Baumgartner
 1997 Brad Larsen
 1998 Cory Sarich, Jesse Wallin
 1999 Mike Van Ryn
 2000 Manny Malhotra
 2001 Steve McCarthy
 2002 Jarret Stoll
 2003 Scottie Upshall
 2004 Dan Paille
 2005 Mike Richards
 2006 Kyle Chipchura
 2007 Kris Letang
 2008 Karl Alzner
 2009 Thomas Hickey
 2010 Patrice Cormier
 2011 Ryan Ellis
 2012 Jaden Schwartz
 2013 Ryan Nugent-Hopkins
 2014 Scott Laughton
 2015 Curtis Lazar
 2016 Brayden Point
 2017 Dylan Strome
 2018 Dillon Dubé
 2019 Maxime Comtois
 2020 Barrett Hayton
 2021 Kirby Dach*, Dylan Cozens and Bowen Byram
 2022 Kaiden Guhle (winter), Mason McTavish (summer)
 2023 Shane Wright

Note: Kirby Dach was injured (missing the entire tournament), Dylan Cozens and Bowen Byram replaced him as captain.

World U18 championships
 2002 André Benoit
 2003 Braydon Coburn
 2004 John Lammers
 2005 Ryan Parent
 2006 Ty Wishart
 2007 Angelo Esposito
 2008 Cody Hodgson
 2009 Ryan O'Reilly
 2010 Erik Gudbranson
 2011 Ryan Murray
 2012 Matt Dumba
 2013 Sam Reinhart
 2014 Roland McKeown
 2015 Mitchell Stephens
 2016 Tyson Jost
 2017 Jaret Anderson-Dolan
 2018 Ty Smith
 2019 Peyton Krebs
 2021 Shane Wright
 2022 Connor Bedard
 2023 TBD

       
Captain
Ice hockey captains